Kakshivat son of Dirghatamas was an ancient vedic sage (rishi). He was called praja (strong). He had his daughter Ghosha as student , who, like her father, composed Vedic verses. His descendants are also called Kakshivatas .

See also
Anga Kingdom
Hindu reform movements

Rigveda
Vedic period